Timo Bortolotti (Darfo (Brescia), 1889 – Milan, 1954) was an Italian sculptor.

Biography
Bortolotti attended the Brera Academy for a short period before leaving to serve in World War I, after which he established himself as a sculptor in Brescia and produced the monument to the fallen at Passo del Tonale (1923). He moved to Milan in 1924 and it was through contact with the Novecento Italiano movement that his initial realism turned towards an austere form of Classicism. His participation in the Venice Biennale began by invitation with the 17th Esposizione Internazionale d’Arte di Venezia in 1930, which led to an increase in the number of commissions for public works of art. The Galleria d’Arte Moderna, Milan, bought one of his works in 1932 and 1935 was a year of particular success. He was awarded the Savoia-Barbante Prize in Rome, held his first solo show at the Galleria Dedalo in Milan and took part in the second Rome Quadrenniale. He was awarded the first prize for foreign sculpture in Paris at the Exposition Internationale of 1937.

Exhibition 
 "Mostre d'arte in risaia", Mortara, 1936 and 1938, curator  Carlo Ernesto Accetti.
 VII Sindacale, Milan, 1936
 Esposizione alla Zattera dell'Associazione nazionale marinai in congedo ai Navigli, Milao, 1936, curator Carlo Ernesto Accetti

References
 Antonella Crippa, Timo Bortolotti, online catalogue Artgate by Fondazione Cariplo, 2010, CC BY-SA (source for the first revision of this article).

Other projects

Brera Academy alumni
Artists from the Province of Brescia
Italian military personnel of World War I
1889 births
1951 deaths
20th-century Italian sculptors
20th-century Italian male artists
Italian male sculptors
People from Darfo Boario Terme